Don't Touch the Light is the first album by German hard rock band Bonfire, following its name change from Cacumen. It was released in 1986 on RCA Records.

AllMusic wrote that the album is considered a "classic" of the "melodic hard rock" genre.

Track listing

Remastered edition
In 2009, Don't Touch the Light was remastered by Toni Ubler for the company Yesterrock. This edition of the album now featured seven additional songs—all live performances by Bonfire from circa 1986 when the album was originally released.

Band members
Claus Lessmann - lead & backing vocals
Hans Ziller - lead & acoustic guitars, backing vocals
Horst Maier - lead guitar, backing vocals
Joerg Deisinger - bass, backing vocals
Dominik Huelshorst - drums, percussion, backing vocals

References

Bonfire (band) albums
1986 debut albums
RCA Records albums